Acrocera orbiculus, also known as the top-horned hunchback, is a species of fly belonging to the family Acroceridae. The species has a holarctic distribution, ranging from North America to the Palaearctic.

Etymology
The specific name is the Latin diminutive noun , meaning 'a small disk'.

Description
"Antennae placed at the extreme top of the head, ending in a long thin arista. Venation very much reduced. Proboscis absent, or very short and stumpy"

Biology
The larvae are endoparasites of spiders in the families Amaurobiidae, Clubionidae and Lycosidae.

References

External links
GBIF
External images

Acroceridae
Insects described in 1787
Diptera of North America
Asilomorph flies of Europe
Endoparasites